Harilaid (Swedish Hares, formerly Gräsö) is a small uninhabited island in Estonia. It should not be confused with the larger former island of Harilaid that is now a peninsula on the northwest coast of the island of Saaremaa.

The island is stony, with a covering of juniper.

A lighthouse was first built on Harilaid in 1849.

Uninhabited islands of Estonia
Vormsi Parish
Estonian islands in the Baltic